Tel Arad is an unrecognized Bedouin village, located north-west of the town Arad, with a population of 1,700 residents. The original residents of the area were the Jahalin tribe who were transferred by the state in 1948, and reside in the area of Mishor Edomim. After the establishment of the state of Israel, the state transferred to the area internally displaced people from other areas of the Negev, mostly from the Lakiya area.

The archeological site Tel Arad is located near the village.

References

Bedouin localities in Israel
Populated places in Southern District (Israel)